Wroxeter is a village in Shropshire, England, which forms part of the civil parish of Wroxeter and Uppington, beside the River Severn,  south-east of Shrewsbury.

Viroconium Cornoviorum, the fourth largest city in Roman Britain, was sited here, and is gradually being excavated.

History

Roman Wroxeter, near the end of the Watling Street Roman road that ran across Romanised Celtic Britain from Dubris (Dover), was a key frontier position lying on the bank of the River Severn whose valley penetrated deep into what later became Wales, and also on a route south leading to the Wye valley.

Archaeology has shown that the site of the later city first was established about AD 55 as a frontier post for a Thracian legionary cohort located at a fort near the Severn river crossing. A few years later a legionary fortress (castrum) was built within the site of the later city for the Legio XIV Gemina during their invasion of Wales.

The local British tribe of the Cornovii had their original capital (also thought to have been named *Uiroconion) at the hillfort on the Wrekin. When the Cornovii were eventually subdued their capital was moved to Wroxeter and given its Roman name.

This legion XIV Gemina was later replaced by the Legio XX Valeria Victrix which in turn relocated to Chester around AD 88. As the military abandoned the fortress the site was taken over by the Cornovians' civilian settlement.

The name of the settlement, meaning "Viroconium of the Cornovians", preserves a native Brittonic name that has been reconstructed as *Uiroconion ("[the city] of *Uirokū"), where *Uiro-ku ( "man"-"wolf") is believed to have been a masculine given name meaning "werewolf". 

Viroconium prospered over the next century, with the construction of many public buildings, including thermae and a colonnaded forum. At its peak, it is thought to have been the 4th-largest settlement in Roman Britain, with a population of more than 15,000.

The Roman city is first documented in Ptolemy's 2nd century Geography as one of the cities of the Cornovii tribe, along with Chester (Deva Victrix).

Following the Roman withdrawal from Britain around AD 410, the Cornovians seem to have divided into Pengwern and Powys. The minor Magonsæte sub-kingdom also emerged in the area in the interlude between Powysian and Mercian rule. Viroconium may have served as the early post-Roman capital of Powys prior to its removal to Mathrafal sometime before 717, following famine and plague in the area.

N. J. Higham proposes that Wroxeter became the eponymous capital of an early sub-Roman kingdom known as the Wrocensaete, which he asserts was the successor territorial unit to Cornovia.  The literal meaning of Wrocensaete is 'those dwelling at Wrocen', which Higham interprets as Wroxeter.  It may refer quite specifically to the royal court itself, in the first instance, and only by extension to the territory administered from the court.

The Roman city was rediscovered in 1859 when workmen began excavating the baths complex. A replica Roman villa was constructed in 2010 for a Channel 4 television programme called Rome Wasn't Built in a Day and was opened to the public on 19 February 2011.

St Andrew's

At the centre of Wroxeter village is Saint Andrew's parish church, some of which is built from re-used Roman masonry. The oldest visible section of the church is the Anglo-Saxon part of the north wall which is built of Roman monumental stone blocks. The chancel and the lower part of the tower are Norman. The gatepiers to the churchyard are a pair of Roman columns and the font in the church was made by hollowing out the capital of a Roman column. Later additions to the church incorporate remains of an Anglo-Saxon preaching cross and carvings salvaged from nearby Haughmond Abbey following the Dissolution of the Monasteries.

St. Andrew's was declared redundant in 1980 and is now managed by The Churches Conservation Trust. St. Andrew's parish is now united with that of St. Mary, Eaton Constantine.

Literary reference
A. E. Housman visited the site and was impressed enough to write of "when Uricon the city stood", the poem ending "Today the Roman and his trouble Are ashes under Uricon."

Bernard Cornwell has the main character of The Saxon Stories visit Wroxeter in Death of Kings, referring to it as an ancient Roman city that was "as big as London" and using it as an illustration of his pagan beliefs that the World will end in chaos.

Sport
The village previously had a football team named Wroxeter Rovers. In 2017, the club relocated to nearby Shrewsbury and was renamed to Shrewsbury Juniors, in order to provide a senior football team for children progressing through the club's junior football system to take part in after the age of 16–17. The club were champions of the Shropshire County League Premier Division in 2020-21.

See also
Listed buildings in Wroxeter and Uppington

References

Further reading

External links

Photos of Wroxeter and surrounding area on geograph.org.uk
English Heritage: Information for teachers

Villages in Shropshire
Populated places on the River Severn